Purbalingga (Javanese: ꦥꦸꦂꦧꦭꦶꦁꦒ) is a town and district in Central Java Province of Indonesia and the seat of Purbalingga Regency

Villages 
The district includes 11 urban villages (kelurahan) and 2 rural villages (desa) - the latter being Toyareja and Jatisaba in the east of the district. The populations of these 13 villages according to the official estimates as at mid 2021 were as follows:

 Bojong (4,908)
 Toyareja (3,229)
 Kedung Menjangan (3,948)
 Jatisaba (5,062)
 Bascar (4,813)
 Purbalingga Wetam (5,854)
 Penambongan (3,015)
 Purbalingga Kidul (2,657)
 Kandang Gampang (6,270)
 Purbalingga Kulon (4,778)
 Purbalingga Lor (7,479)
 Kembaran Kulon (2,905)
 Wirasana (3,611)

The kelurahan of Karangsentul (in neighbouring Padamara District) and the kelurahan of Kalikabong, Karangmanyar and Mewek (in neighbouring Kalimanah District) are adjacent to the town of Purbalingga and serve as suburbs to the town.

Gallery

Climate
Purbalingga has a tropical rainforest climate (Af) with moderate rainfall from July to September and heavy to very heavy rainfall from October to June. The following climate data is for the town of Purbalingga.

References

External Links 
 (in Indonesian)

Districts of Central Java
Regency seats of Central Java